Emil Sommerstein (July 6, 1883 in the village of Hleszczawa near Trembowla – May 26, 1957 in Middletown, New York, United States) was a Polish-Jewish lawyer, philosopher, activist and politician.

Sommerstein spent most of his life in Lwów, where in the interwar period he was director of the Lawyers Office. Between 1922 and 1939, he was a deputy to the Polish Parliament (with a break from 1927 to 1929), where he was a member of several commissions. He also published articles in several Polish and Jewish newspapers and magazines, such as Chwila, Glos Prawa and Gazeta Bankowa. 
Among others, he founded first organization of Jewish farmers - Lesser Poland's Union of Farmers, and in 1933, he co-created United Antihitlerite Committee in Warsaw. When Lwow was annexed by the Soviet Union in its invasion of Poland,  Sommerstein organized the Committee of Helping Jewish Refugees from Germany. Arrested by the NKVD, he was sent to a Gulag prison camp, and later released. After the war, he was released on the condition that he become the Minister for Jewish Affairs in the communist-sponsored Polish Committee of National Liberation provisional government. He used this position to help Armia Krajowa partisans flee to the United Kingdom in disguise as Orthodox Jews. In 1946 Sommerstein left Poland for USA, where he died.

Sources

References 

1883 births
1957 deaths
People from Ternopil Oblast
People from the Kingdom of Galicia and Lodomeria
Jews from Galicia (Eastern Europe)
Austro-Hungarian Jews
19th-century Polish Jews
Members of the Sejm of the Second Polish Republic (1922–1927)
Members of the Sejm of the Second Polish Republic (1930–1935)
Members of the Sejm of the Second Polish Republic (1935–1938)
Members of the Sejm of the Second Polish Republic (1938–1939)
Members of the State National Council
Polish cooperative organizers
Polish deportees to Soviet Union
Polish people detained by the NKVD
Foreign Gulag detainees
Austro-Hungarian military personnel of World War I
Recipients of the Gold Cross of Merit (Poland)
Politicians from Lviv